Kevin Sanasy (born 2 November 1984) is an English former professional footballer who played as a striker.

Playing career
Sanasy began his career at Bradford City at the age of 9, signing the same week as Danny Forrest. He scored a club record of nearly 100 goals for the youth and reserve teams. Shortly after his debut Sanasy had a run-in with teammate Gareth Edds on the team bus, and was warned about his conduct by manager Nicky Law. He scored his only senior goal for the club in April 2004. He left the club, initially on loan at Halifax Town, before commencing a career in non-league football.

He had brief loan spells at Halifax Town and Leigh RMI, before he moved to Farsley Celtic.

He had spells at Guiseley, Witton Albion, Worksop Town and F.C. Halifax Town.

He was offered a trial back at Bradford City in 2010 but he went on holiday instead.

Coaching career
Sanasy undertook his UEFA B coaching qualification in 2018, and he became a coach at Bradford City's academy that year.

References

External links

1984 births
Footballers from Leeds
Living people
Bradford City A.F.C. players
Halifax Town A.F.C. players
Bradford (Park Avenue) A.F.C. players
Worksop Town F.C. players
Association football forwards
English footballers
Bradford City A.F.C. non-playing staff